Carmada is an electronic music project by Australian record producer Yahtzel (Max Armata), and formerly a duo with record producer L D R U (Drew Carmody). Their debut single, "Maybe" was certified Gold in Australia in 2015.

Discography

Extended plays

Singles

Remixes

References

Australian electronic musicians
Mad Decent artists
Owsla artists